Charles William "Dub" O'Neill, Jr. is a former member of the Ohio House of Representatives.

References

1940s births
Republican Party members of the Ohio House of Representatives
Living people